Acianthera calypso is a species of orchid plant native to Ecuador.

References 

calypso
Flora of Ecuador